The , also referred to as U.S. Ryukyu Islands, was the government in the Ryukyu Islands, Japan (centered on the Okinawa Island) from 1945 to 1950, whereupon it was replaced by the United States Civil Administration of the Ryukyu Islands (USCAR).

Background
The first prolonged American presence in the Ryukyu Islands commenced with the arrival of Commodore Matthew C. Perry in May 1853, on Okinawa. A bit more than one year later, this presence ended when Perry left. Perry had hoped to use Okinawa as a springboard to opening up relations with Japan during the Bakumatsu period. Almost 100 years later, Americans returned to the islands, beginning in April 1945, after the last battle of World War II came to an end. Again, the American presence was as a stepping stone to Japan.

Government system

Governors

See also

 United States Civil Administration of the Ryukyu Islands
 Government of the Ryukyu Islands, the body of Okinawan self-governance from 1952 to 1972.
 1945 Katsuyama killing incident
 :ja:琉球列島米国軍政府
 Naval Base Okinawa

References

1945 establishments in Japan
1950 disestablishments in Japan
Ryukyu Islands
Government agencies established in 1945
Government agencies disestablished in 1950
History of United States expansionism
Japan–United States relations
Okinawa under United States occupation
Postwar Japan
Shōwa period